Sophie Augusta of Holstein-Gottorp (5 December 1630 in Gottorp – 12 December 1680 in Coswig) was regent of Anhalt-Zerbst in during the minority of her son from 1667 until 1674.

Life
She was a daughter of Frederick III, Duke of Holstein-Gottorp and Duchess Marie Elisabeth of Saxony. On 16 September 1649 in Gottorp, she married John VI, Prince of Anhalt-Zerbst. After her husband died in 1667, she became regent for her minor son Charles William, until he came of age in 1674.

Issue 
She had fourteen children:
John Frederick, Hereditary Prince of Anhalt-Zerbst (b. Zerbst, 11 October 1650 – d. Zerbst, 13 March 1651).
George Rudolph, Hereditary Prince of Anhalt-Zerbst (b. Zerbst, 8 September 1651 – d. Zerbst, 26 February 1652).
Karl William, Prince of Anhalt-Zerbst (b. Zerbst, 16 October 1652 – d. Zerbst, 8 November 1718).
Anthony Günther, Prince of Anhalt-Mühlingen (b. Zerbst, 11 January 1653 – d. Zerbst, 10 December 1714).
John Adolph (b. Zerbst, 2 December 1654 – d. Zerbst, 19 March 1726).
John Louis I, Prince of Anhalt-Zerbst-Dornburg (b. Zerbst, 4 May 1656 – d. Dornburg, 1 November 1704).
Joachim Ernest (b. Zerbst, 30 July 1657 – d. Zerbst, 4 June 1658).
Magdalene Sophie (b. Zerbst, 31 October 1658 – d. Zerbst, 30 March 1659).
Frederick (b. Zerbst, 11 July 1660 – d. Zerbst, 24 November 1660).
Hedwig Marie Eleonore (b. Zerbst, 30 January 1662 – d. Zerbst, 30 June 1662).
Sophie Auguste (b. Zerbst, 9 March 1663 – d. Weimar, 14 September 1694), married on 11 October 1685 to Johann Ernst III, Duke of Saxe-Weimar.
A daughter (b. and d. Zerbst, 12 February 1664).
Albert (b. and d. Zerbst, 12 February 1665).
Augustus (b. Zerbst, 23 August 1666 – d. Zerbst, 7 April 1667).

Duchesses of Holstein-Gottorp
German princesses
German female regents
17th-century women rulers
1630 births
1680 deaths
17th-century German people
Princesses of Anhalt-Zerbst
Royal reburials
Daughters of monarchs